Curtis High School, operated by the New York City Department of Education, is one of seven public high schools located in Staten Island, New York City, New York. It was founded on February 9, 1904, the first high school on Staten Island.

History
Curtis High School is named after nationally prominent Republican writer and orator George W. Curtis, who lived nearby. The school was the first public building built following the consolidation of Greater New York. It was part of a plan to erect a major high school in each of the outlying boroughs, with Erasmus Hall High School in Brooklyn, Morris High School in the Bronx, and Flushing High School in Queens being the other three. It was designed by the architect C. B. J. Snyder. The cornerstone was laid in 1902, it was completed and opened 1904. The original building of brick and limestone is dominated by a large square turreted tower inspired by English medieval models. The first principal was Columbia graduate Oliver Durfee Clark, who served 1904 to 1906. The second principal (1906–1912) was Harry Freeman Towle, a graduate of Dartmouth College. Additions were made to the building in 1922, 1925 and 1937. John M Avent (Columbia Graduate, author) was principal from 1924 to the late 1940s. Curtis was designated a New York City Landmark on October 12, 1982. The gym and cafeteria wings were added at a later date as additions to the original building's neo-Gothic architecture.

Academics
Curtis offers an International Baccalaureate Scholarship Honors program with accelerated curriculum and Advanced Placement courses, and courses include nursing, NJROTC, performing arts, visual arts, business/computer institute, CoOp, human and legal studies, journalism institute and school for international services.

Extracurricular activities
Curtis offers a robotics team, National Honor Society, chess club, Key Club, black and Hispanic awareness clubs, film club, Moot Court, the Curtis Players, jazz band, orchestra, dance, symphonic band, the Curtis Log (newspaper), Crosswinds (yearbook), math team, criminal law and justice mentoring program, peer mediation and conflict resolution programs.

Sports 
Curtis fields over thirty varsity teams, including a swimming team, as well as golf, bowling, volleyball, soccer, basketball, wrestling baseball/softball, tennis, track/cross country, gymnastics, lacrosse and football teams. In addition, Curtis club teams include boys' varsity and junior varsity, and girls' varsity Ultimate teams. The Curtis High School Track was named after Abel Kiviat and the Baseball Field was renamed Bobby Thomson Field in 2007

Enrollment
Curtis has a total enrollment of about 3,006 and is open to residents of New York City entering either ninth or tenth grade. Enrollment requirements vary depending on which of the ten "houses" the student is going to be enrolled. There are zoned programs where enrollment is based mostly on geography, with Staten Island residents having priority over all other boroughs. Within Staten Island, geographical areas closer to the school have priority over all other areas of Staten Island. Most other programs rely either on the prospective student's grades and city standardized tests or specialized enrollment tests.

The school's population is 38% African American, 31% Hispanic, 22.9% White and 7.5% Asian.

Feeder patterns and admissions
All New York City students entering high school must apply to schools, as there are no zoning boundaries for high schools in New York City. Only special zoned programs have geographical restrictions whereby certain areas of Staten Island have priority over all of the rest of New York City.

Notable alumni

Vincent Robert Capodanno, US Navy chaplain, received the Medal of Honor after dying under fire in Vietnam. Father Capodanno Boulevard is named for him, as is the 
Joseph F. Merrell Jr. (1926–1945), posthumously awarded United States Medal of Honor for combat in World War II. A ferry is named for him.
Jeb Stuart Magruder, lawyer, advisor to President Nixon, Watergate conspirator
Ralph J. Lamberti, Staten Island borough president
Alfred E. Santangelo, United States Congressman 
Loring McMillen, Official Staten Island historian, and one of the founders of the Richmondtown Museum

Arts and music
Florina Kaja, reality TV star
Lois Lowry, children's author, two-time Newbery Medal winner
Amy Vanderbilt (1908–1974), author of the best-selling Complete Book of Etiquette (1952). A native of Staten Island
Emily Genauer, art critic, won a Pulitzer Prize for newspaper reporting. 
Mario Buatta, famous interior designer
Betty Aberlin, children's television actress known for Mister Rogers' Neighborhood, poet, activist
Selita Ebanks, Victoria's Secret Model
The RZA, hip-hop recording artist, and producer, and member of the Wu-Tang Clan. In his song "Sunshower", he raps, "Old Earth got nervous, walked me to Shaolin, sent me to Curtis"
Richie Castellano, singer, songwriter, musician, guitarist and keyboard player for the Blue Oyster Cult
David O. Stewart '69, historian and author
Michael Henry Heim (1943–2012), literary translator, inducted as a fellow of the American Academy of Arts and Sciences
Robert F. Gleckner (1925–2001), English professor, author and editor; internationally renown William Blake and Lord Byron scholar and Romanticism expert.

Sports
Andrew J. Barberi, football player and longtime Curtis High coach. Staten Island ferry MV Andrew J. Barberi is named for him.
Irv Constantine, NFL player
Terry Crowley, major league baseball player
Dominique Easley, NFL player
Frank Fernández, Major League Baseball player, Yankees, Athletics, Senators, Cubs 
Steve Gregory, football player for the Los Angeles Rams
Mouhamadou Gueye, basketball player
Jack Hynes '37, Soccer Hall of Fame and MVP of the American Soccer League 
James Jenkins, former football player with the Washington Redskins
Halil Kanacevic, professional basketball player
Abel Kiviat '08, Olympic Silver medalist 1912
Shemiah LeGrande, current player for the Detroit Lions
Hassan Martin, basketball player
Elmer Ripley, early pro basketball player and college coach
Sonny Ruberto, major league baseball player
Bobby Thomson '42, baseball player for the New York Giants, famous for "the Shot Heard 'Round the World"
Vernon Turner, '01 former player for the Buffalo Bills
Anthony Varvaro, Atlanta Braves relief pitcher
Isaiah Wilkerson, basketball player

Parental support
Parents collaborate with the school's administration and its staff through monthly PTA meetings, PTA newsletters, School Leadership Team meetings, Gear-Up, Principal's Consultative Council, Health Fair, HIV AIDS Team, and the football, track, robotics and performing arts parents clubs.

Community support
Partnerships:
 Liberty Partnership Mentoring Program (CSI)
 Gear-Up
 Discovery Institute (CSI)
 Brooklyn Polytechnic University Center for Youth in Engineering and Science
 Curtis HS Career Connections
 Global Ambassadors
Corporations: 
 Infinity Broadcasting
 MIX 102.7 FM
 O’Melveny & Myers Law Firm
Higher education institutions:
 College of Staten Island
 St. John's University
Cultural/arts organizations: 
 Snug Harbor
Community-based organizations:
 NYCID
 Liberty Partnership
 P.A.S.S.
Hospital outreach:
 Sea View Hospital Rehabilitation Center and Home
 Staten Island University Hospital
 St. Vincent's Hospital
 Egger Nursing Home
Financial institutions:
 Federal Reserve Bank Mentoring Program

Schoolwide awards and recognition 
 7-time PSAL Girls' Bowling Championship
 13-time PSAL Boys' Cross Country City Championship (1928, 1929, 1930 [nationals], 1931, 1933, 1935, 1938)
 7-time PSAL Boys' Football Championship (1998, 1999, 2002, 2007, 2009, 2016, 2017)
 3-time PSAL Boys' Golf City Championship
 2-time PSAL Girls' Cross Country City Championship
 3 time Boys' PSAL Indoor Track City Championships, (first one in 1909 with help of Olympic Silver medal winner Abel Kiviat),1928
 Boys' PSAL Bowling Championship
 Girls' PSAL Basketball "A" City Championship (2011, 2012, 2013)
 Girls' PSAL Golf City Championship
 2-time Girls' PSAL Lacrosse City Championship (2015, 2016)
Boys' PSAL Lacrosse City Championship (2016) 
 Boys' PSAL Basketball "A" City Championship
 Boys' PSAL Wrestling "A" City Championship
 3-time Girls' PSAL Wrestling Championship (2013, 2014, 2015)
 Boys' PSAL Soccer Championship (1915, 1917)
 Boys' PSAL Baseball Championship (1943, 1961, 1962)
 Boys' PSAL Tennis Singles Championship (1917)
 Boys' Lacrosse Semi Finals NYC (1915,2017,2019)

Other
Curtis alumn Jason Defazio was killed on 9/11. He worked on the 104th floor of the World Trade Center at Cantor Fitzgerald.

See also 

List of New York City Designated Landmarks in Staten Island
National Register of Historic Places listings in Richmond County, New York

References

External links 

 Curtis HS official website
 St. George Civic Association: Curtis High School
 Curtis High School Association of Alumni and Friends (CHSAAF)
 Class of 1974 reunion organization

Educational institutions established in 1904
Public high schools in Staten Island
New York City Designated Landmarks in Staten Island
Magnet schools in New York (state)
 
St. George, Staten Island
1904 establishments in New York City